Máynez is a Spanish surname.  Notable people with the surname include:

Alberto Maynez, 19th-century Governor of New Mexico
Alejandro Máynez (born 1970s), Mexican serial killer
Eduardo García Máynez (1908–1993), Mexican jurist

Spanish-language surnames